Line 15 of the Shanghai Metro is a north-south metro line in the city of Shanghai that opened on 23 January 2021. It will be  in length and have 30 stations. The line is one of Shanghai Metro's new batch of high capacity fully automated and driverless lines along with Lines 14 and 18. The line is colored ivory on system maps.

History 
The line was originally scheduled to open by the end of 2020. However, on 24 December 2020, Shanghai Metro officials announced that the opening would take place in 2021, prior to the start of the Chinese New Year. Line 15 opened on January 23, 2021.  station opened on June 27, 2021.

On January 19, 2021, there is a partial collapse in an under-construction Exit 9 of Zizhu Hi-tech Park station. There were no casualties at the scene, no impact on the surrounding environment, and no impact on the opening of Line 15.

Controversy 
On 28 December 2011, the northern terminus of the line was shifted from  station to an independent station called , located near Line 7 between Qihua and  but with no direct interchange to Line 7. This has stirred controversy among residents over Line 15's already lack of convenient connections with other major subway lines such as Lines Line 2 and Line 10. In December 2019, the line was further revised to provide an interchange with Line 2 at  station.

Stations

Service routes
</onlyinclude>{|border=1 style="border-collapse: collapse;" class="mw-collapsible"
! colspan="12" style="text-align: center" bgcolor=# | 
|-
| colspan="12" style="text-align: left" | 
 M - Mainline:  ↔ 
 C - Core:  ↔ 
 P - Peak:  ↔  (only operating during working day peak)
|-bgcolor=#
! rowspan="1" colspan="3" |
! colspan="2" | 
! rowspan="2" | 
! colspan="3" rowspan="1" | 
! rowspan="2" | 
! rowspan="2" | 
! rowspan="2" | 
|-bgcolor=#
! rowspan="1" | 
! rowspan="1" | 
! rowspan="1" | 
! 
! 
! colspan="2" |
! 
|-
|align="center"|●||align="center"| ||align="center"|●
|
|
|
|0.0
|0.0
|0
|rowspan="4"|Baoshan
|rowspan="16"|23 Jan 2021
|rowspan="5"|Underground Island
|-
|align="center"|●||align="center"| ||align="center"|●
|
|
|
|3.09
|3.09
|4
|-
|align="center"|●||align="center"| ||align="center"|●
|
|
|
|1.21
|4.30
|7
|-
|align="center"|●||align="center"| ||align="center"|●
|
|
|
|1.00
|5.30
|9
|-
|align="center"|●||align="center"| ||align="center"|●
|
|
|
|1.40
|6.70
|11
|rowspan="8"|Putuo
|-
|align="center"|●||align="center"|●||align="center"|●
|
|
|
|1.49
|8.19
|13
|Underground Side & Island
|-
|align="center"|●||align="center"|●||align="center"|●
|
|
|
|0.70
|8.89
|15
|rowspan="5"|Underground Island
|-
|align="center"|●||align="center"|●||align="center"|●
|
|
| 
|1.63
|10.52
|18
|-
|align="center"|●||align="center"|●||align="center"|●
|
|
|
|1.40
|11.92
|21
|-
|align="center"|●||align="center"|●||align="center"|●
|
|
|
|0.67
|12.59
|23
|-
|align="center"|●||align="center"|●||align="center"|●
|
|
|
|1.42
|14.02
|25
|-
|align="center"|●||align="center"|●||align="center"|●
|
|
|
|0.88
|14.90
|27
|Underground Side & Island
|-
|align="center"|●||align="center"|●||align="center"|●
|
|
|
|1.42
|16.32
|29
|rowspan="3"|Changning
|rowspan="18"|Underground Island
|-
|align="center"|●||align="center"|●||align="center"|●
|
|
| (via )
|1.37
|17.69
|32
|-
|align="center"|●||align="center"|●||align="center"|●
|
|
|
|1.71
|19.50
|35
|-
|align="center"|●||align="center"|●||align="center"|●
|
|
|
|0.86
|20.36
|37
|rowspan="1"|Minhang
|-
|align="center"|●||align="center"|●||align="center"|●
|
|
|
|1.41
|21.77
|39
|rowspan="7"|Xuhui
|27 June 2021
|-
|align="center"|●||align="center"|●||align="center"|●
|
|
|
|0.86
|22.64
|41
|rowspan="13"|23 Jan 2021
|-
|align="center"|●||align="center"|●||align="center"|●
|
|
|   
|1.86
|24.50
|44
|-
|align="center"|●||align="center"|●||align="center"|●
|
|
|
|1.16
|25.66
|47
|-
|align="center"|●||align="center"|●||align="center"|●
|
|
|
|1.36
|27.02
|50
|-
|align="center"|●||align="center"|●||align="center"|●
|
|
|
|1.04
|28.06
|52
|-
|align="center"|●||align="center"|●||align="center"|●
|
|
|
|0.76
|28.82
|54
|-
|align="center"|●||align="center"|●||align="center"|●
|
|
|
|1.58
|30.40
|57
|rowspan="7"|Minhang
|-
|align="center"|●||align="center"|●||align="center"|●
|
|
|
|1.17
|31.57
|59
|-
|align="center"|●||align="center"|●||align="center"|●
|
|
|
|1.37
|32.94
|62
|-
|align="center"|●||align="center"|●||align="center"|●
|
|
|
|0.95
|33.89
|64
|-
|align="center"|●||align="center"| ||align="center"|
|
|
|
|2.80
|36.69
|67
|-
|align="center"|●||align="center"| ||align="center"|
|
|
|
|2.66
|39.35
|71
|-
|align="center"|●||align="center"| ||align="center"|
|
|
|
|1.87
|41.22
|74
|- style = "background:#; height: 2pt"
| colspan = "12" |
|- bgcolor="lightgrey"
|align="center"| ||align="center"| ||align="center"|
|
|
|
|
|
|
|Minhang
|rowspan="4"|South extension under planning
|rowspan="4"| 
|- bgcolor="lightgrey"
|align="center"| ||align="center"| ||align="center"|
|
|
|
|
|
|
|rowspan="3"|Fengxian
|- bgcolor="lightgrey"
|align="center"| ||align="center"| ||align="center"|
|
|
|
|
|
|
|- bgcolor="lightgrey"
|align="center"| ||align="center"| ||align="center"|
|
|
|
|
|
|
|- style = "background:#; height: 2pt"
| colspan = "12" |
|-
| colspan = "12" |
|- style = "background: #; height: 2pt;"
| colspan = "12" |
|}
</onlyinclude>

Important stations

Future expansion
A South extension to Fengxian is under planning.

Station name change

Headways

Technology

Signalling 
Line 15 is notable for being driverless and the longest line in China operating GoA4 (Grade-of-Automation 4), whereby trains may operate automatically at all times, including the actions of opening/closing doors, detecting obstacles and reacting to emergencies. There are no staff on board concerned with ongoing train operations.

Between December 2020 and January 2021, SATEE supplied its OptONIX and ONIX metro traction systems for 324 metro cars of Shanghai Line 15, with support from Xi'an Alstom Yongji Electric Equipment Co. Ltd (XAYEECO). It was also responsible for the train control monitoring system (TCMS) of Shanghai Line 15, and the line's train electrical design. During the same period, CASCO has successfully put into service its Urbalis 888 signalling solution on six of these metro lines in Chengdu and Shanghai.

Rolling Stock

References

Shanghai Metro lines
Railway lines opened in 2021
 
2021 establishments in China
Automated guideway transit